Benjamin Ayre (born 8 December 1995) is an Australian professional basketball player for the Cairns Taipans of the National Basketball League (NBL). He played college basketball in the United States for Skagit Valley College and Newman University before joining the Adelaide 36ers of the NBL as a development player in 2019. He played briefly in Lithuania for BC Mažeikiai in 2020 and in 2022 had a breakout stint with the Taipans.

Early life
Ayre was born in the Australian state of Victoria. He attended De La Salle College in Melbourne.

College career
Ayre moved to the United States in 2015 to attend Skagit Valley College. He played two seasons of college basketball for the Cardinals, earning second-team All-NWAC North Region in both 2016 and 2017 and averaged 15.2 points, 2.4 rebounds and 3 assists per game.

In 2017, Ayre transferred to Newman University and played the next two seasons for the Jets. He averaged 13.4 points, 2.2 rebounds and 3.9 assists in 27 games in 2017–18, and 12.9 points, 3.1 rebounds and 4.6 assists in 29 games in 2018–19. He was named second-team All-Heartland Conference as a senior.

Professional career
On 21 May 2019, Ayre signed with the Nunawading Spectres for the rest of the 2019 NBL1 season. He helped the Spectres reach the grand final, where they won the championship with a 99–90 win over the Bendigo Braves. In 15 games, he averaged 4.8 points, 2.1 rebounds and 2.1 assists per game.

In August 2019, Ayre signed with the Adelaide 36ers of the National Basketball League (NBL) as a development player. He appeared in two games for the 36ers during the 2019–20 NBL season.

On 6 September 2020, Ayre signed with BC Mažeikiai of the Lithuanian Basketball League. Due to family reasons, he left the team and returned to Australia on 22 November 2020. In eight games during the 2020–21 LKL season, he averaged 9.3 points, 2.4 rebounds and 2.6 assists per game.

For the 2021 NBL1 South season, Ayre joined the Knox Raiders. In 11 games, he averaged 12.0 points, 2.5 rebounds, 3.5 assists and 1.4 steals per game.

For the 2021–22 NBL season, Ayre joined the Cairns Taipans as a training player. He was set to be Scott Machado's injury replacement early in the season, but a nasty knee injury from an innocuous rebound drill at practice put him on the sidelines for two months. He was elevated to the roster for the first time on 1 April 2022. On 18 April 2022, in just his sixth appearance for the Taipans, Ayre scored a team-high 20 points to go with 10 assists, four rebounds, three steals and four 3-pointers in a 92–80 loss to Melbourne United. He became just the third player in 2021–22 to record 20 points and 10 assists in a game alongside Bryce Cotton and Jaylen Adams. In eight games for the Taipans, he averaged 6.63 points, 1.75 rebounds and 3.75 assists per game.

On 23 April 2022, Ayre signed with the Cairns Marlins for the 2022 NBL1 North season. In 21 games, he averaged 23.9 points, 3.76 rebounds and 4.05 assists per game.

On 21 July 2022, Ayre signed a two-year deal (second year club option) with the Taipans.

References

External links

NBL profile
NBL1 profile
Newman Jets bio

1995 births
Living people
Adelaide 36ers players
Australian expatriate basketball people in Lithuania
Australian expatriate basketball people in the United States
Australian men's basketball players
Basketball players from Melbourne
BC Mažeikiai players
Cairns Taipans players
Guards (basketball)
Newman University, Wichita alumni
Sportsmen from Victoria (Australia)